The Queen Elizabeth II Stadium is a multi-use sports venue in Enfield, London. Built initially as a venue for athletics, in 2011 a three-year refurbishment was completed to allow the stadium to be used for football. The Stadium is a Grade II Listed Building.

History
In 1939, construction of a new sports venue for Enfield began. The centerpiece was an athletics stadium, with additional space on the site for ball sports and a swimming pool. Due to the Second World War, work on the site was suspended, with the stadium not being completed until 1953. The athletics stadium, named after Queen Elizabeth II for her Silver Jubilee in 1977, was used as a training venue by a number of significant British athletes, including Sebastian Coe, Daley Thompson and Linford Christie, all of whom won Olympic titles.

By 2008, the venue had fallen into disuse. Enfield Town F.C., which had been formed in 2001, and who had been groundsharing with Brimsdown Rovers, came to an agreement with Enfield Council to refurbish the stadium for use as a multi-use venue, with the track being resurfaced and the stadium brought up to the standard required for football in the Isthmian League. Enfield Town moved to their new stadium in 2011, with their first official game taking place against a Tottenham Hotspur XI.

In 2014, during upgrades to the New River Stadium, the London Skolars played six home games at the QEII stadium during the second half of the rugby league season.

In 2018, the stadium was one of the venues for the 2018 ConIFA World Football Cup, with ten games played there: six group games, and four in the knockout round, including the final on 9 June 2018.

Facilities
The main element part of the stadium is the pavilion, completed in 1953. This is a Grade II listed building built in Art Deco style, and serves as the clubhouse, main stand and changing rooms. Opposite the main stand is a second, small seated stand, while behind each goal, inside the perimeter of the running track, are two covered terraces. The running track was reduced from eight lanes to six during the refurbishment from 2008 to 2010.

International football

References

Enfield, London
Buildings and structures in the London Borough of Enfield
Football venues in England
Sports venues in London
Athletics venues in London
Sports venues completed in 1953
CONIFA World Football Cup stadiums
Grade II listed buildings in the London Borough of Enfield
1953 establishments in England
Rugby league stadiums in England